Aclis is a genus of small sea snails, marine gastropod mollusks in the family Eulimidae.

Species

 Aclis acuta (Jeffreys, 1884)
 Aclis angulata E. A. Smith, 1890
 Aclis ascaris (Turton, 1819)
 Aclis attenuans Jeffreys, 1883
 Aclis californica Bartsch, 1927
 Aclis conula Dall, 1927
 Aclis cubana Bartsch, 1911
 Aclis didyma E. A. Smith, 1890
 Aclis eoa Melvill, 1896
 Aclis eolis Bartsch, 1947
 Aclis floridana Bartsch, 1911
 Aclis gittenbergeri (De Jong & Coomans, 1988)
 Aclis gulsonae (W. Clark, 1850)
 Aclis hendersoni Dall, 1927
 Aclis immaculata Dall, 1927
 Aclis kanela Absalão, 2009
 Aclis limata Dall, 1927
 Aclis macrostoma Barros, Lima & Francisco, 2007
 Aclis maestratii Poppe & Tagaro, 2016
 Aclis maoria Powell, 1937
 Aclis marguerita (Bartsch, 1947)
 Aclis minor (Brown, 1827)
 Aclis occidentalis (Hemphill, 1894)
 Aclis pseudopareora Powell, 1940
 Aclis pyramida Dall, 1927
 Aclis rhyssa Dall, 1927
 Aclis rushi Bartsch, 1911
 Aclis sarissa Watson, 1881
 Aclis sarsi Dautzenberg & H. Fischer, 1912
 Aclis scalaris (Garcia-Talavera, 1975)
 Aclis shepardiana Dall, 1919
 Aclis simillima E. A. Smith, 1890
 Aclis stilifer Dall, 1927
 Aclis subcarinata (Murdoch & Suter, 1906)
 Aclis tanneri (Bartsch, 1947)
 Aclis tenuis A. E. Verrill, 1882
 Aclis terebra (Powell, 1930)
 Aclis trilineata Watson, 1897
 Aclis tumens Carpenter, 1857
 Aclis turrita (Carpenter, 1864)
 Aclis verduini van Aartsen, Menkhorst & Gittenberger, 1984
 Aclis vitrea Watson, 1897
 Aclis walleri Jeffreys, 1867
 Aclis watsoni Barros, Lima & Francisco, 2007

taxon inquirendum:
 Aclis angulata P. Fischer in de Folin & Périer, 1869

Species brought into synonymy:
 Aclis acuminata H. Adams & A. Adams: synonym of Amaea acuminata (Sowerby II, 1844)
 Aclis acutalis (Jeffreys, 1883): synonym of Aclis attenuans Jeffreys, 1883
 Aclis atemeles Melvill, 1896: synonym of Iravadia atemeles (Melvill, 1896)
 Aclis beddomei Dautzenberg, 1912: synonym of Acliceratia beddomei (Dautzenberg, 1912)
 Aclis bermudensis Dall & Bartsch, 1911: synonym of Murchisonella spectrum (Mörch, 1875)
 Aclis carinata E. A. Smith, 1872: synonym of Acliceratia carinata (E. A. Smith, 1872)
 Aclis carolinensis Bartsch, 1911: synonym of Hemiaclis carolinensis (Bartsch, 1911)
 Aclis dalli Bartsch, 1911: synonym of Aclis sarissa Watson, 1881
 Aclis egregia Dall, 1889: synonym of Costaclis egregia (Dall, 1889)
 Aclis expansa (Powell, 1930): synonym of Eusetia expansa (Powell, 1930)
 Aclis farolita Nordsieck, 1969: synonym of Graphis albida (Kanmacher, 1798)
 Aclis fernandinae Dall, 1927: synonym of Aclis tenuis A. E. Verrill, 1882
 Aclis georgiana Dall, 1927: synonym of Hemiaclis georgiana (Dall, 1927)
 Aclis hyalina (Watson, 1880): synonym of Costaclis hyalina (Watson, 1881)
 Aclis jeffreysii Tryon, 1887: synonym of Graphis striata (Jeffreys, 1884)
 Aclis kermadecensis Knudsen, 1964: synonym of Crinolamia kermadecensis (Knudsen, 1964)
 Aclis labiata A. Adams, 1860: synonym of Cyclonidea labiata (A. Adams, 1860)
 Aclis lata Dall, 1889: synonym of Umbilibalcis lata (Dall, 1889)
 Aclis lineata Monterosato, 1869: synonym of Fusceulima lineata (Monterosato, 1869)
 Aclis mizon Watson, 1881: synonym of Costaclis mizon (Watson, 1881)
 Aclis monolirata de Folin, 1873: synonym of Ebalina monolirata (de Folin, 1873)
 Aclis muchia Locard, 1896: synonym of Costaclis mizon (Watson, 1881)
 Aclis nucleata Dall, 1889: synonym of Costaclis hyalina (Watson, 1881)
 Aclis pendata Dall, 1927: synonym of Aclis stilifer Dall, 1927
 Aclis polita A. E. Verrill, 1872: synonym of Eulimella polita (A. E. Verrill, 1872)
 Aclis striata A. E. Verrill, 1880: synonym of Odostomia striata (A. E. Verrill, 1880)
 Aclis supranitida (S. V. Wood, 1842): synonym of Aclis minor (Brown, 1827)
 Aclis tenuistriata G. B. Sowerby III, 1892: synonym of Acliceratia tenuistriata (G. B. Sowerby III, 1892)
 Aclis tricarinata Watson, 1897: synonym of Pseudoscilla bilirata (de Folin, 1870)
 Aclis trilirata de Folin, 1872: synonym of Pyramidelloides triliratus (de Folin, 1873)
 Aclis ventrosa Friele, 1876: synonym of Hemiaclis ventrosa (Friele, 1876)
 Aclis verrilli Bartsch, 1911: synonym of Aclis tenuis A. E. Verrill, 1882
 Aclis vixornata de Folin, 1878: synonym of Ebalina vixornata (de Folin, 1878)

References

 Gofas, S.; Le Renard, J.; Bouchet, P. (2001). Mollusca, in: Costello, M.J. et al. (Ed.) (2001). European register of marine species: a check-list of the marine species in Europe and a bibliography of guides to their identification. Collection Patrimoines Naturels, 50: pp. 180–213

External links
  Serge GOFAS, Ángel A. LUQUE, Joan Daniel OLIVER,José TEMPLADO & Alberto SERRA (2021) - The Mollusca of Galicia Bank (NE Atlantic Ocean); European Journal of Taxonomy 785: 1–114

 
Eulimidae
Gastropod genera